Hafiz Sulejman Pačariz (1900 — 1945) was an Islamic cleric of Albanian origin and commander of the detachment of Muslim militia from the village of Hisardžik (Prijepolje, modern-day Serbia) during the Second World War. When Germans took over control over Sandžak in 1943 Pačariz was appointed as commander of SS Polizei-Selbstschutz-Regiment Sandschak. Forces under his command were referred to as Pačarizovci (meaning "those belonging to Pačariz"). He allegedly led his forces while riding a black horse. In 1945, Pačariz was captured, put on trial, found guilty for massacres of civilians and executed as war criminal.

Early life 
Pačariz was born in Bioča near Berane in 1900. His father was the local khawaja, or Muslim religious leader. In 1912, during the First Balkan War, his village was set on fire by the Army of Montenegro, so his family fled, first to Lozna near Bijelo Polje and then to Brodarevo where his father became the local imam. In 1922, the Chetniks killed his father because he supported the local outlaw Jusuf Mehonjić. Until that time, Sulejman was a member of Yugoslav gendarmerie. After the murder of his father, Sulejman joined the outlaws of Mehonjić for a short time and joined the gendarmerie again. Before 1930, he accepted the position of imam in Hisardžik. In 1938 Pačariz accepted the position of military imam in the county of Bar.

World War II

Within the Ustaše 

At the beginning of the Second World War in Yugoslavia, Ustaše forces of the Independent State of Croatia occupied Sandžak and appointed Pačariz, together with some other Muslim notables from Sandžak, on paid positions of military officers of the Sandžak Muslim militia. They were initially given the ranks of Major, and engaged against the Serbs who were part of the Chetniks. By September of 1941, the Ustaše handed control over Sandžak to the Italians.

Within the forces of Italy 
At the end of autumn of 1941, Montenegrin communists attempted to negotiate with Pačariz but failed to convince him and his subordinated officer to join the Partisans. Pačariz mobilized Muslims who lived in Prijepolje, on the right bank of Lim and the former municipalities of Velika Župa and Seljašnica. He received some weapons and military equipment from Ustaše and later from the Italians. Pačariz often reported bigger number of militiamen under his command and kept for himself their monthly salaries received from the Italians.

In mid-November of 1941, a Chetnik unit of 40 men went to Kosatica and attempted to disarm the Muslim militia that were commanded by Sulejman Pačariz. The militiamen refused to surrender their arms, and in a subsequent struggle, a firefight engaged where two of them were killed while one Chetnik was wounded. To revenge death of his two men, Muslim militia under command of Pačariz attacked one part of Kosatica that populated by some Serbs and captured, brutally tortured, and killed seven Serbs from Kosatica.

Battle of Sjenica 

On the 22nd of December, 1941, forces of the Muslim militia from Hisardžik and Sjenica that were commanded by Pačariz, successfully repelled the attack of Partisans who attempted to capture Sjenica. 18 Partisans were captured during this battle. Pačariz occasionally visited them in Sjenica's prison. In February of 1942, Pačariz was convinced by the command of Italian forces in Prijepolje to go to Sjenica and escort the 18 Partisans who were captured in that battle. The Italians intended to exchange  the captured Partisans for some of the captured Italians. He escorted 13 Partisans to Prijepolje, leaving the 5 other wounded Partisans in Sjenica. All the Partisans that Pačariz brought to the Italians were shot and killed in the Purića stream, below Srijetež.

Pačariz would establish the so-called "flying platoon" of his most loyal men. He used the unit to forcefully mobilize people and to force wealthier Muslims to buy arms from him. Those who opposed him were brutally beaten and terrorized. Together with other commanders of Muslim militia (including Husein Rovčanin) he participated in a conference in village of Godijeva, and agreed to attack the Serb villages near Sjenica and other parts of Sandžak.

Within the forces of Germany 

Following his appointment to the post of Höhere SS-und Polizeiführer Sandschak (Higher SS and Police Leader Sandžak) in September 1943, Karl von Krempler came to be known as the "Sandžak Prince" after his relatively successful formation of the SS Polizei-Selbstschutz-Regiment Sandschak. He went to the Sandžak region in October and took over the local militia of around 5,000 men headquartered in Sjenica. This formation was sometimes thereafter called the Kampfgruppe Krempler or more derisively the "Muselmanengruppe von Krempler". As the senior Waffen SS officer, Karl von Krempler appointed Pačariz as the formal commander of the unit, but as the key military trainer and contact person with German arms and munitions, remained effectively in control. Pačariz participated in the Axis organized Operation Kugelblitz that started on 4 December 1943. In 1944, Pačariz personally killed his unit commander Hamda Bajraktarević during the meeting, because of Bajraktarević's attempts to create cooperation with partisans.

In November 1944, after taking many losses from the Partizans, Pačariz and together with his units, retreated to Sarajevo where SS Polizei-Selbstschutz-Regiment Sandschak was put under command of Ustaše General Maks Luburić. Pačariz was promoted to the rank of Ustaše Colonel.

Death 

In 1945 Pačariz was captured near Banja Luka. where he was put on trial and found guilty for massacres of civilians. He was executed as a war criminal.

Pačariz is also commemorated in a song.

References

Sources

External links 
 KAKO JE ZAVRŠIO SULEJMAN-HODŽA PAČARIZ  Jedan od muslimanskih junaka Drugog svjetskog rata   - The end of Sulejman-Hodža Pačariz, one of Muslim heroes during the Second World War, published in Croatian

1945 deaths
People from Prijepolje
Yugoslav military personnel of World War II
Executed military personnel
Albanian fascists
Albanians in Montenegro
Albanian collaborators with Fascist Italy
Albanian collaborators with Nazi Germany
Executed Yugoslav collaborators with Nazi Germany
Sandžak Muslim militia
1900 births